Borai High School is a public co-educational high school in Borai, Pingla, Paschim Medinipur district, established in 1967. Situated at middle position of the village & beside Lord Shiva Temple, also beside Primary School.
Borai high school is one of the pioneer of education in the extreme rural area of Pingla block in the district of Paschim Medinipur. Since the year  1967 this school has been carrying out the enlightened torch of education to let the learners achieve solemn success. This is a Bengali medium Government Sponsored school which has its own Higher Secondary segment with good co-education environment. The school seeks to provide proper education to all its students and create a high quality learning environment that is innovative, challenging and inspiring. Here the school community works together with supreme dedication and unparallel endeavour for the betterment of the students in every aspect. The vision of the school is to blend literary, cultural and human values into every student of the school.

History 
The school opened  in 1967 in Paschim Medinipur district.
The school namely Borai High School  is situated in  a remote village  in Pingla Block in the district of Paschim Medinipur. To move  the boys and girls of the locality towards  an educational institution and to bring them under the light of education, some noble and education loving people  of the Borai, Hasimnagar, Belar, Dujipur, Raghunathchak, Asti and  Jhilinga  mouza  thought of establishing  an educational  institution  in the locality. The generously contributed  to the noble cause  of establishing  a school  at  Borai  mouza. The school  had a humble beginning in 1967 as a 2 class junior high school in four bamboo thatched rooms and with 95 students.  At present the school  has been upgraded to a  Govt. Sponsored Higher secondary school. Now it is one of the developing School in the Pingla Block with 571 students in the current academic year  and has  own  hostel building  for the ST & SC students  with a sanctioned quota of 104 students. The School Managing Committee, the teachers and non teaching  staffs of the school  are doing their best in their respective fields of work  for the betterment of the school.

Fee Structure 
According to government regulations, education for all students is free of cost.

Admissions procedure 
Admission for new students class V to class IX generally takes place during the month of January. Admission for class XI and class XII takes place the month of June and July every year as per govt rules and criteria.

External links 
 Facebook
 @BoraiHighSchool Twitter

References 

High schools and secondary schools in West Bengal
Schools in Paschim Medinipur district
Educational institutions established in 1967
1967 establishments in West Bengal